Friendly Enemies may refer to:
 Friendly Enemies (1942 film), an American drama film based on the play
 Friendly Enemies (1925 film), an American silent comedy thriller film based on the play
 Friendly Enemies (play), a play written by Aaron Hoffman and Samuel Shipman